Virgin Lake is a small lake, with moderately clear water, located at the edge of the Henry M. Jackson Wilderness Area along the Blanca Lake Trail in Washington, United States. The lake is 4,577 ft. (1,395 m) above sea level.

Fauna
The lake contains several species of fish, including muskellunge, panfish, several species of bass, northern pike, and walleye.

See also
List of lakes in Washington
List of lakes of the United States

Notes

References

External links

Lakes of Washington (state)
Lakes of Snohomish County, Washington
Protected areas of Snohomish County, Washington
Mount Baker-Snoqualmie National Forest